Cuergo (Spanish: Cuérigo) is one of 18 parishes (administrative divisions)  in Aller, a municipality within the province and autonomous community of Asturias, in northern Spain.

Villages and hamlets
 La Barraca
 El Fabarín
 La Fragua
 El Quentu
 Valdeberruga

References

Parishes in Aller